Victoria Azarenka and Caroline Wozniacki were the defending champions, but they chose to compete in 2010 Dubai Tennis Championships instead.Vania King and  Michaëlla Krajicek won in the final 7–5, 6–2 against Bethanie Mattek-Sands and Meghann Shaughnessy.

Seeds

Draw

Draws

External links
Main Draw Doubles

2010 Regions Morgan Keegan Championships and the Cellular South Cup
Cellular South Cup - Doubles